The Rodrigues night heron (Nycticorax megacephalus) is an extinct species of heron formerly occurring on the Mascarene island of Rodrigues.

Taxonomy
It is known from subfossil bones and the 1708 description of Leguat as well as the 1726 report of Julien Tafforet.

Description

The skull of the Rodrigues night heron was 154 long,the upper mandible was 94 mm and the lower was 147.

Behaviour and ecology

Little is known about the behaviour of the Rodrigues night heron apart from the two contemporary descriptions. Leguat's 1708 description, wherein he stated the bird fed on endemic Phelsuma geckos (likely the Rodrigues day gecko), reads as follows:

Milne-Edwards suggested in 1874 that the Rodrigues night heron had reduced power of flight, an opinion which Günther and Newton corroborated in 1879 by measuring the known wing-bones and founding all of them except the scapula to have been reduced in size and strength, while retaining the same shape as those of other herons.

Tafforet's account reads as follows: 

Both authors agree that this bittern-like bird, the size of a  fat chicken or small egret, was mainly terrestrial, unwary, and only flew when chased, although even in that case they initially tried to escape by running. They apparently laid greenish eggs; one of their favorite foods was geckos, probably the Rodrigues day gecko as the other local species, the Rodrigues giant day gecko was nearly as long as the bird itself (both gecko species are nowadays extinct too). Analysis of the fossil remains concluded that the bill of the species was very strong (hence the name megacephalus, i.e. "large-headed") and that it was evolving towards flightlessness.

Many other species endemic to Rodrigues became extinct after humans arrived, and the island's ecosystem is heavily damaged. Before humans arrived, forests covered the island entirely, but very little remains today. The Rodrigues night heron lived alongside other recently extinct birds, such as the Rodrigues solitaire, Rodrigues parrot, Newton's parakeet, Rodrigues rail, Rodrigues scops owl, Rodrigues starling, and the Rodrigues pigeon. Extinct reptiles include the domed Rodrigues giant tortoise, the saddle-backed Rodrigues giant tortoise, and the Rodrigues day gecko.

Extinction
The bird appears to have been hunted to extinction in the mid-18th century. Pingré mentions in his report that no "bitterns" could be found on Rodrigues anymore in 1761.

References

 Cheke, A.S. 1987. An ecological history of the Mascarene Islands, with particular reference to extinctions and introductions of land vertebrates. In: Diamond, A.W. (ed.), Studies of Mascarene island birds, pp. 5-89. Cambridge University Press, Cambridge, U.K. 
 Cowles, G. S. 1987. The fossil record. In: Diamond, A.W. (ed.), Studies of Mascarene Island birds, pp. 90-100. Cambridge University Press, Cambridge, U.K. 
 Hachisuka, M. 1953. The Dodo and kindred birds. Witherby, London. 
 Milne-Edwards, Alphonse (1873): Recherches sur la faune ancienne des Îles Mascareignes. Ann. Sci. Nat. Zool. (Paris) 5(19), Article 3, plate 14. [Article in French] Note: Usually, the year of publication is given as 1874. However, although the volume was nominally of that year, it was already released in 1873.

Extinct birds of Indian Ocean islands
Nycticorax
Bird extinctions since 1500
Birds described in 1874
Fauna of Rodrigues